The Journal of Contemporary European Studies is a quarterly peer-reviewed academic journal that covers European studies. It was established in 1980 as the Journal of Area Studies: Series 1 and renamed Journal of Area Studies in 1992. In 1999 it was again renamed as the Journal of European Area Studies, before obtaining its current name in 2003. It is published by Routledge and the editor-in-chief is Martin Bull (University of Salford)

Abstracting and indexing

The journal is abstracted and indexed in:

Current Contents/Social and Behavioral Sciences
EBSCO databases
International Bibliography of Periodical Literature
International Bibliography of the Social Sciences
Modern Language Association Database
ProQuest databases
Scopus
Social Sciences Citation Index
According to the Journal Citation Reports, the journal has a 2019 impact factor of 0.909.

References

External links

European studies journals
Publications established in 1980
English-language journals
Quarterly journals
Routledge academic journals